The 26th Toronto International Film Festival ran from September 6 to September 15, 2001. There were 326 films (249 feature films, 77 short films) from 54 countries scheduled to be screened during the ten-day festival. During a hastily arranged press conference on September 11, Festival director Piers Handling and managing director Michelle Maheux announced that 30 public screenings and 20 press screenings would be cancelled during the sixth day of the festival due to the September 11, 2001 attacks in New York City and Washington, D.C. The festival resumed for the final four days though some films were cancelled because the film prints could not reach Toronto due to flight restrictions.

Awards

Programmes

Viacom Galas
 Cet Amour-là by Josée Dayan
 Dark Blue World by Jan Sverák
 Enigma by Michael Apted
 From Hell by Albert Hughes and Allen Hughes
 Hearts in Atlantis by Scott Hicks
 Lantana by Ray Lawrence
 The Last Kiss by Gabriele Muccino
 Last Orders by Fred Schepisi
 Last Wedding by Bruce Sweeney
 Life as a House by Irwin Winkler
 Monsoon Wedding by Mira Nair
 No Man's Land by Danis Tanovic
 Novocaine by David Atkins
 Serendipity by Peter Chelsom
 Taking Sides by István Szabó
 Tosca by Benoît Jacquot
 Training Day by Antoine Fuqua
 The Triumph of Love by Clare Peploe

Canadian Open Vault
 The Grey Fox by Phillip Borsos

Contemporary World Cinema
 À ma soeur! by Catherine Breillat
 Abandoned by Árpád Sopsits
 Absolutely Fabulous (Absolument fabuleux) by Gabriel Aghion
 Address Unknown by Kim Ki-duk
 All About Lily Chou-Chou by Shunji Iwai
 Après la réconciliation by Anne-Marie Miéville
 Asoka by Santosh Sivan
 Ball in the House by Tanya Wexler
 Baran by Majid Majidi
 Beijing Bicycle by Wang Xiaoshuai
 The Believer by Henry Bean
 Big Bad Love by Arliss Howard
 Birthday Girl by Jez Butterworth
 Brainstorm by Laís Bodanzky
 Broken Silence by Montxo Armendáriz
 The Business of Strangers by Patrick Stettner
 C'est la vie by Jean-Pierre Améris
 La Ciénaga by Lucrecia Martel
 La Commune (Paris, 1871) by Peter Watkins
 The Daughter of Keltoum by Mehdi Charef
 The Days Between by Maria Speth
 Deathrow by Joel Lamangan
 Delbaran by Abolfazl Jalili
 Distance by Hirokazu Kore-Eda
 A Dog's Day by Murali Nair
 Drift by Michiel van Jaarsveld
 Dust by Milcho Manchevski
 Eden by Amos Gitaï
 L'Emploi du temps by Laurent Cantet
 The Fluffer by Richard Glatzer and Wash West
 Get a Life by João Canijo
 The Grey Zone by Tim Blake Nelson
 Harmful Insect by Akihiko Shiota
 Hi, Tereska by Robert Glinski
 The Hired Hand by Peter Fonda
 Honey For Oshún by Humberto Solás
 How Harry Became a Tree by Goran Paskaljević
 Hush! by Ryosuke Hashiguchi
 Ignorant Fairies by Ferzan Özpetek
 Jan Dara by Nonzee Nimibutr
 The Jimmy Show by Frank Whaley
 Kissing Jessica Stein by Charles Herman-Wurmfeld
 Lagaan by Ashutosh Gowariker
 Le Lait de la tendresse humaine by Dominique Cabrera
 Lan Yu by Stanley Kwan
 Late Marriage by Dover Kosashvili
 Latitude Zero by Toni Venturi
 Light of My Eyes by Giuseppe Piccioni
 Loco Fever by Andrés Wood
 Loin by André Téchiné
 Lovely & Amazing by Nicole Holofcener
 Lovely Rita by Jessica Hausner
 The Man from Elysian Fields by George Hickenlooper
 Manic by Jordan Melamed
 Margarita Happy Hour by Ilya Chaiken
 Markova: Comfort Gay by Gil M. Portes
 Maya by Digvijay Singh
 Mirror Image by Hsiao Ya-chuan
 Musa - The Warrior by Kim Sung-su
 My Kingdom by Don Boyd
 Nine Queens by Fabián Bielinsky
 No Shame by Joaquín Oristrell
 The Only Journey of His Life by Lakis Papastathis
 The Orphan of Anyang by Wang Chao
 Otilia by Dana Rotberg
 Passport by Péter Gothár
 Pauline et Paulette by Lieven Debrauwer
 Piñero by Leon Ichaso
 Le Pornographe by Bertrand Bonello
 The Quickie by Sergei Bodrov
 Quitting by Zhang Yang
 Rain by Christine Jeffs
 Reines d'un jour by Marion Vernoux
 Revolution#9 by Tim McCann
 The Road by Darezhan Omirbaev
 Samsara by Pan Nalin
 Secret Ballot by Babak Payami
 Sex and Lucia by Julio Médem
 Silent Partner by Alkinos Tsilimidos
 Sisters by Sergei Bodrov Jr.
 Slogans by Gjergj Xhuvani
 Strumpet by Danny Boyle
 To End All Wars by David L. Cunningham
 Tuesday by Geoff Dunbar
 Under the Skin of the City by Rakhshan Bani Etemad
 Unfinished Song by Maziar Miri
 Vacuuming Completely Nude In Paradise by Danny Boyle
 Violet Perfume by Maryse Sistach
 Waterboys by Shinobu Yaguchi
 What Time Is It There? by Tsai Ming-liang
 Y tu mamá también by Alfonso Cuarón
 The Zookeeper by Ralph Ziman
 Zus & Zo by Paula van der Oest

Dialogues: Talking with Pictures
 Exterminating Angel by Luis Buñuel
 The Killing by Stanley Kubrick
 Rollerball by Norman Jewison
 Two-Lane Blacktop by Monte Hellman
 Wild Strawberries by Ingmar Bergman

Spotlight: Ulrich Seidl
 Animal Love by Ulrich Seidl
 Dog Days by Ulrich Seidl
 Loss Is To Be Expected by Ulrich Seidl
 Models by Ulrich Seidl

Discovery
 Absolute Hundred by Srdan Golubović
 Asuddelsole by Pasquale Marrazzo
 The Bank by Robert Connolly
 Be My Star by Valeska Grisebach
 Blue Spring by Toyoda Toshiaki
 Bread and Milk by Jan Cvitkovič
 The Butterfly by Moon Seung-wook
 Le Café de la plage by Benoît Graffin
 Chicken Rice War by Chee Kong Cheah
 Everybody Says I'm Fine! by Rahul Bose
 Happy Man by Malgorzata Szumowska
 Magonia by Ineke Smits
 Mostly Martha by Sandra Nettelbeck
 Mr In-Between by Paul Sarossy
 Le Souffle by Damien Odoul
 La Spagnola by Steve Jacobs

Jean Pierre Lefebvre: Vidéaste
 L'Âge des images I: Le Pornolithique by Jean Pierre Lefebvre
 L'Âge des images II: L'Écran invisible by Jean Pierre Lefebvre
 L'Âge des images III: Comment filmer Dieu by Jean Pierre Lefebvre
 L'Âge des images IV: Mon chien n'est pas mort by Jean Pierre Lefebvre
 L'Âge des images V: La Passion de l'innocence by Jean Pierre Lefebvre
 The House of Light (La Chambre blanche) by Jean Pierre Lefebvre
 Le jour S... by Jean Pierre Lefebvre
 My Friend Pierrette (Mon amie Pierrette) by Jean Pierre Lefebvre
 The Old Country Where Rimbaud Died (Le Vieux pays où Rimbaud est mort) by Jean Pierre Lefebvre

Masters
 Éloge de l'amour by Jean-Luc Godard
 L' Anglaise et le duc by Éric Rohmer
 Buñuel and King Solomon's Table by Carlos Saura
 The Diaries of Vaslav Nijinsky by Paul Cox
 Je rentre à la maison by Manoel de Oliveira
 Millennium Mambo by Hou Hsiao-hsien
 Mulholland Drive by David Lynch
 The Navigators by Ken Loach
 La Pianiste by Michael Haneke
 The Profession of Arms by Ermanno Olmi
 Pulse by Kiyoshi Kurosawa
 The Son's Room by Nanni Moretti
 The Sun Behind the Moon by Mohsen Makhmalbaf
 Trouble Every Day by Claire Denis
 Warm Water Under a Red Bridge by Shōhei Imamura

Midnight Madness
 The American Astronaut by Cory McAbee
 Antinome by Grégory Morin
 Bang Rajan The Legend of the Village Warriors by Thanit Jitnukul
 The Bunker by Rob Green
 Clip Cult (Vol. 1) by Chris Cunningham, Hiroyuki Nokomo, Kouji Morimoto, Spike Jonze, Michel Gondry, Mark Adcock and Antoine Bardou Jaquet
 Dogtown and Z-Boys by Stacy Peralta
 Eat by Bill Plympton
 Electric Dragon 80,000 V by Sogo Ishii
 Full Time Killer by Johnnie To and Wai Ka-Fai
 Ichi the Killer by Takashi Miike
 Le Pacte des loups by Christophe Gans
 Versus by Ryuhei Kitamura

National Cinema Programme
 As White as in Snow by Jan Troell
 Cabin Fever by Mona J. Hoel
 Cool and Crazy by Knut Erik Jensen
 Earth by Veikko Aaltonen
 Elling by Petter Næss
 Fiasco by Ragnar Bragason
 Gossip by Colin Nutley
 The Icelandic Dream by Róbert I. Douglas
 Italian for Beginners by Lone Scherfig
 Jalla! Jalla! by Josef Fares
 Kira's Reason - A Love Story by Ole Christian Madsen
 Ode to a Hunter by Per Fronth
 The River by Jarmo Lampela
 A Song for Martin by Bille August
 You Really Got Me by Pål Sletaune

Perspective Canada
 Black Soul by Martine Chartrand
 1:1 by Richard Reeves
 After by Byron Lamarque
 Un Arbre avec un chapeau by Pascal Sanchez
 The Art of Woo by Helen Lee
 Century Hotel by David Weaver
 Charlie Noir by Keith Davidson
 Cyberman by Peter Lynch
 FILM(dzama) by Deco Dawson
 The Frank Truth by Rick Caine
 A Fresh Start by Jason Buxton
 The Green by Paul Carrière
 I Shout Love by Sarah Polley
 In Memoriam by Aubrey Nealon
 Inertia by Sean Garrity
 Inséparables by Normand Bergeron
 Instant Soup by Bridget Hill
 Jean Laliberté: A Man, His Vision and a Whole Lot of Concrete by Philippe Falardeau
 The Judgment by Serge Marcotte
 Khaled by Asghar Massombagi
 Lilith on Top by Lynne Stopkewich
 Lip Service: A Mystery by Ann Marie Fleming
 Lola by Carl Bessai
 Lollipops by Graham Tallman
 Mariages by Catherine Martin
 On Their Knees by Anais Granofsky
 Rare Birds by Sturla Gunnarsson
 Remembrance by Stephanie Morgenstern
 Romain et Juliette by Frédéric Lapierre
 Scènes d'enfants by Lara Fitzgerald
 Self: (Portrait/Fulfillment) A Film By the Blob Thing by Brian Stockton
 Sight Under Construction by John Kneller
 Silent Song by Elida Schogt
 Soft Shell Man by André Turpin
 Soowitch by Jean-François Rivard
 Strange Invaders by Cordell Barker
 Suddenly Naked by Anne Wheeler
 Tar Angel by Denis Chouinard
 Three Sisters on Moon Lake by Julia Kwan
 The Topic of Cancer by Ramiro Puerta
 Touch by Jeremy Podeswa
 Treed Murray by William Phillips
 Walk Backwards by Laurie Maria Baranyay
 Westray by Paul Cowan
 The Woman Who Drinks by Bernard Émond

Planet Africa
 É Minha Cara by Thomas Allen Harris
 100 Days by Nick Hughes
 L'Afrance by Alain Gomis
 Bintou by Fanta Regina Nacro
 The Father by Ermias Woldeamlak
 Inch'Allah Dimanche by Yamina Benguigui
 Karmen by Joseph Gaï Ramaka
 The Killing Yard by Euzhan Palcy
 Malunde by Stefanie Sycholt
 Mouka by Adama Roamba
 Paris: XY by Zeka Laplaine
 Snipes by Richard Murray
 Surrender by Celine Gilbert

Real to Reel
 Carving Out Our Name by Tony Zierra
 El Caso Pinochet by Patricio Guzmán
 Chop Suey by Bruce Weber
 Digital Short Films by Three Filmmakers: In Public by Jia Zhangke, Digitopia by John Akomfrah and A Conversation With God by Tsai Ming-liang Facing the Music by Bob Connolly and Robin Anderson
 Fidel by Estela Bravo
 Grateful Dawg by Gillian Grisman
 Hell House by George Ratliff
 How's Your News? by Arthur Bradford
 It's About Time by Ayelet Menahemi and Elona Ariel
 James Ellroy's Feast of Death by Vikram Jayanti
 Japanese Devils by Minoru Matsui
 Missing Young Woman by Lourdes Portillo
 Much Ado About Something by Michael Rubbo
 Nazareth 2000 by Hany Abu-Assad
 Okie Noodling by Bradley Beesley
 Privé by Heddy Honigmann
 Promises by Justine Shapiro, B.Z. Goldberg and Carlos Bolado
 The Struma by Simcha Jacobovici
 The Universal Clock: The Resistance of Peter Watkins by Geoff Bowie
 Warrior of Light by Monika Treut

Special Presentations
 Atanarjuat: The Fast Runner by Zacharias Kunuk
 Buffalo Soldiers by Gregor Jordan
 La Chambre des officiers by François Dupeyron
 Christmas Carol: The Movie by Jimmy T. Murakami
 Comment j'ai tué mon père by Anne Fontaine
 The Devil's Backbone by Guillermo del Toro
 Emil and the Detectives by Franziska Buch
 Le Fabuleux Destin d'Amélie Poulain by Jean-Pierre Jeunet
 Focus by Neal Slavin
 Heist by David Mamet
 Hotel by Mike Figgis
 In the Bedroom by Todd Field
 Joy Ride by John Dahl
 Ma femme est une actrice by Yvan Attal
 Nosferatu, A Symphony of Horror by F. W. Murnau
 Picture Claire by Bruce McDonald
 Prozac Nation by Erik Skjoldbjærg
 The Safety of Objects by Rose Troche
 Sidewalks of New York by Edward Burns
 Sur mes lèvres by Jacques Audiard
 Tape by Richard Linklater
 Thirteen Conversations About One Thing by Jill Sprecher
 Waking Life by Richard Linklater
 Who is Cletis Tout? by Chris Ver Wiel
 World Traveler by Bart Freundlich

Wavelengths
 ATOZ by Robert Breer
 Automatic Writing by Fred Worden
 Baby Dream II by Miles McKane
 The Back Steps by Leighton Pierce
 Color Study by Vincent Grenier
 Les Coquelicots by Rose Lowder
 The Dark Room by Minyong Jang
 The Deformation of the Setting Sun by Joseph Leclerc
 Didam by Olivier Fouchard and Mahine Rouhi
 Emanance by Craig A. Lindley
 Engram Sepals (Melodramas 1994–2000) by Lewis Klahr
 Exposed by Siegfried A. Fruhauf
 Interior: New York Subway, 14th Street to 42nd Street by G.W. (Billy) Bitzer
 Intrude Sanctuary by Hsiao Shuo-wen
 L'Iris fantastique by Segundo de Chomón
 The Last Lost Shot by Cécile Fontaine
 Love's Refrain by Nathaniel Dorsky
 Lovesong by Stan Brakhage
 Marisa by Jacopo Quadri
 Mist by Matthias Müller
 Nipkow TV by Christian Hossner
 Outermost by Stephanie Maxwell and Allan Schindler
 Post Mortem by Catherine Tanitte
 Premières images II by Étienne-Jules Marey
 Le Roi des dollars by Segundo de Chomón
 Schichtwechsel by Christian Hossner
 Serpentine Dance by Annabelle by W.K.L. Dickson and William Heise
 Shudder (Top and Bottom) by Michael Gitlin
 Sliding Off the Edge of the World by Mark Street
 Slit Scan Movie by Christian Hossner
 Soundings by Sandra Gibson
 Tree-line by Gunvor Nelson
 Trees in Autumn by Kurt Kren
 Wot the Ancient Sod by Diane Kitchen

Canada's Top Ten
In December 2001, TIFF introduced the Canada's Top Ten project to identify the year's ten best Canadian films as selected by festival programmers and film critics from across Canada.Atanarjuat: The Fast Runner by Zacharias KunukGinger Snaps by John FawcettThe Heart of the World by Guy MaddinKhaled by Asghar MassombagiLast Wedding by Bruce SweeneyMarriages by Catherine MartinParsley Days by Andrea DorfmanSoft Shell Man by André TurpinThe Woman Who Drinks by Bernard ÉmondThe Uncles'' by James Allodi

References

External links
 Official site
 2001 Toronto International Film Festival at IMDb

2001 film festivals
2001
2001 in Toronto
2001 in Canadian cinema
2001 festivals in North America